Hamilton Wanderers Association Football Club is a semi-professional Association football club from Hamilton, New Zealand, that currently competes in the Northern League.

National League
Hamilton Wanderers joined the New Zealand Football Championship in 2016, following the dissolution of fellow Waikato club WaiBOP United, taking part in the 2016–17 season.

Honours
National Youth League
Champions (1): 2016

References

External links
Club website

Association football clubs in Hamilton, New Zealand
Association football clubs established in 1913
1913 establishments in New Zealand